The Summer We Lived is a 2020 romantic melodrama film directed by  which stars Javier Rey, Blanca Suárez, and Pablo Molinero in a love triangle.

Plot 
The plot delves into a love triangle that took place in the Summer of 1958 in Jerez de la Frontera, concerning an architect who arrived to town to build a winery (Gonzalo), the one ordering the winery (Hernán) and the latter's fiancee (Lucía). A different timeline set in 1998 deals with the reconstruction of the aforementioned love story upon the investigations carried out by a journalist trainee working with obituaries (Isabel) who enlists the collaboration of Carlos, the architect's son.

Cast

Production 
The film is an Aquel Verano Movie AIE, Warner Bros Entertainment España, Atresmedia Cine, Mr. Fields and Friends, La Claqueta PC, Bambú Producciones and 4 Cats Pictures production. Shooting began on 5 August 2019 in Jerez de la Frontera. Shooting locations also included Galicia.

Release 
The film was presented at the 68th San Sebastián International Film Festival on 20 September 2020. Distributed by Warner Bros. Pictures España, it was theatrically released in Spain on 4 December 2020.

Reception 
Elsa Fernández-Santos of El País wrote that the film "confuses eroticism and passion with a grandiloquent epic akin to a tourist postcard, redundant music, aerial shots, and a string of metaphors", with the film resenting from, among other issues, a screenplay "without much narrative foundation" and otherwise also turning out to be "implausible and whimsical".

Mireia Mullor of Fotogramas rated the film 3 out of 5 stars highlighting the landscapes of Jerez de la Frontera vis-à-vis the film's setting as the best thing about the film.

Andrea G. Bermejo of Cinemanía rated the film 3 out of 5 stars, determining as a veredict that the film is "a formulaic [kind of] cinema... which, for that reason, [it] works".

Accolades 

|-
| rowspan = "2" align = "center" | 2021 || rowspan = "2" | 35th Goya Awards || Best Original Score || Federico Jusid ||  || rowspan = "2" | 
|-
| Best Original Song || "El verano que vivimos" by Alejandro Sanz, Alfonso Pérez Arias|| 
|}

See also 
 List of Spanish films of 2020

References 

Films shot in the province of Cádiz
Films shot in Galicia (Spain)
2020s Spanish films
2020s Spanish-language films
Films set in 1958
Atresmedia Cine films
Films set in 1998
Spanish romantic drama films
2020 romantic drama films
Films set in Andalusia
Films about wine
Bambú Producciones films
La Claqueta PC films